JoJo's Band is the chart-topping single by Christie written, composed and sung by lead guitarist of the band Vic Elmes. The song was a moderate success in the UK.

1972 songs